Waltersbach may refer to the following rivers and streams:

 Kleinwaltersdorfer Bach in Saxony
 Waltersbach (Elnhauser Wasser), tributary of the Elnhauser Wasser in Mittelhessen